The Diocese of Tarime is a north-western diocese in the Anglican Church of Tanzania: its current bishop is the Rt Revd Mwita Akiri.

Notes

Anglican Church of Tanzania dioceses
Mara Region
Anglican realignment dioceses